KLK may refer to:

 Kallikrein
 Kalokol Airport, Kenya, by IATA code
 KLK (song)
 KLK anImagine, precursor of Bhutanese animation
 Kono language (Nigeria), by ISO 639 code
 Kuala Lumpur Kepong Berhad, Malaysian multi-national company